The Buick LaCrosse is a mid-size sedan manufactured and marketed by Buick since 2004. The LaCrosse is now in its third generation, slotted above the Buick Regal as the brand's flagship vehicle.

The first-generation LaCrosse replaced the Century and Regal in North America beginning in the 2005 model year, serving as the brand's mid-size car. The automobile was originally sold as the Buick Allure in Canada. For 2010, the LaCrosse was completely redesigned and moved upmarket as a larger premium sedan. The model was redesigned again for 2017.

Although production ended on February 15, 2019 for the North American market, the LaCrosse is still produced in China where it received a facelift for 2019.

Concept 
In 2000, Buick showcased a LaCrosse concept featuring styling features that harkened back to Buicks of the late 1940s, such as a long hood, swooping sidespear (featured on Buicks starting in 1940 and sporadically until the 1970s), front fender port holes, and a fastback roof line.  Unique features included a removable rear roof and trunk panel (converting the trunk into a truck bed) and voice recognition instead of traditional switches for basic interior functions.  The Buick LaCrosse Concept was based on the GM G body shared with the Buick Park Avenue.

First generation (2005)

North America

The LaCrosse debuted in late 2004 as a 2005 model, replacing the Century and Regal. The name was borrowed from a Buick concept car shown in 2000 referencing the sport of lacrosse.

Riding on a revised version of the W-body known as MS2000, the LaCrosse was initially available with two powerplant choices in three trim levels: a 3.8 L 3800 Series III V6 available in base CX and mid-level CXL forms, and a 3.6 L HFV6 V6 in the top line CXS model. The CXS was replaced by the Super in the US market for the 2008 model year. However, sales of the CXS continued in Canada until January 1, 2008.

Power is routed to the front wheels via a 4T65-E automatic transmission (4T65-E HD on Supers). The LaCrosse, along with all other GM vehicles powered by the 3.8 L V6, became the first SULEV-compliant vehicles for 2006.

This generation of LaCrosse was sold in Canada as the Buick Allure, as the verb crosser is a French Canadian vulgarity that can mean either "masturbation" or "scam".

The final first-generation LaCrosse was manufactured on December 23, 2008.

2008
The LaCrosse received a facelift for 2008. The vehicle's front end design was based on the Buick Velite concept, which was later used by the Chinese LaCrosse.

All trim levels received a chrome exterior appearance package, factory remote start feature, XM Satellite Radio, telescoping steering wheel column, redundant steering wheel controls and dual-zone climate control as added standard equipment. CX added a leather-wrapped steering wheel, theft deterrent system, illuminated vanity mirrors, driver information center personalization and more.

Super

Resurrecting the model name from the original 1930s-1950s vehicle, a Super trim of the LaCrosse debuted for 2008. The LaCrosse Super was positioned as a higher-performance model of the sedan with revised front end styling, as well as a return of displaying four Ventiports under the hood, a rear spoiler, projector beam fog lights, Magnasteer, larger brakes, and revised suspension tuning with standard Stabilitrak.

Power came from the 5.3 L LS4 small-block V8 engine featuring Active Fuel Management technology, which is routed to the front wheels. The combination of a V8 and front-wheel drive are not often utilized due to torque steer which is present in any front-wheel-drive car. This powertrain was also found on the Grand Prix GXP, Impala SS, and Monte Carlo SS. Only the 1987 Buick GNX offered a similar level of performance. The LaCrosse Super was discontinued in 2009.

Interior changes included special Super badged cluster with blue face, a wood grain shift knob, and dream weave leather seating.  Interior colors for the Super were Platinum and Mocha Brown, while exterior color choices were Mocha Brown Metallic, Black Onyx, Red Jewel Tincoat, and Platinum Metallic.

Safety
The LaCrosse received a Good overall score in the Insurance Institute for Highway Safety's frontal impact crash test and a Marginal overall rating in the side impact test. Injury measurements for the side-impact crash test include a Poor mark for the driver's torso and a Marginal score for the driver's pelvis and leg.  Side airbags are limited to the curtain type for both front and rear rows; the torso-type side airbag is unavailable. 2007 models also earned one out of five stars in a National Highway Traffic Safety Administration side-impact crash test. The IIHS also found that the 2006–08 model year LaCrosse had the second-highest fatality rate in the large four-door car class; only the Buick Lucerne fared worse.

Models

China
Shanghai GM introduced the Buick LaCrosse in February 2006,  as a more upscale companion to its Buick Regal sedan. Designed by Shanghai GM's Pan Asia Technical Automotive Center (PATAC), the Chinese LaCrosse is based on the same architecture as the North American model, but possesses different exterior and interior designs, and a different engine lineup. The car is also built in Taiwan by a joint Yulon-GM venture.

Eco-Hybrid
In 2008, Shanghai GM introduced a mild hybrid system on the LaCrosse. Using the Belt Alternator Starter system, it is the first hybrid vehicle in the Chinese market as well as the first hybrid in its segment.

Second generation (2010)

Launched at the 2009 North American International Auto Show in Detroit, Michigan, the second-generation Buick LaCrosse was redesigned from the ground-up and moved the nameplate upmarket, becoming Buick's flagship sedan. 

On each side, the exterior would ultimately carry faux vents and a falling swage line, marketed respectively as ventiports and sweepspears — and making vestigial reference to styling hallmarks Buick had incorporated in various forms since introducing them in 1949. The interior highlighted rounded and curved elements. According to The New York Times, the new LaCrosse combined design elements from classic Americans cars of the 1930s and 1950s with traditional Chinese aesthetic elements:

The second-generation LaCrosse employed a long-wheelbase (LWB) variant of the Epsilon II platform, shared with the Opel Insignia, 2010 Saab 9-5 and the Cadillac XTS. The design was based on 2008 Buick Invicta concept, and replaces both the Chinese and North American models. The final design work was carried out at the GM design center in Warren, Michigan.

Engines
The 2.4 L Ecotec four-cylinder replaced the 3.0 V6 as the standard engine on the CX model in the first quarter of 2010. The 3.6 L V6 continues to be an option on the CX and front-wheel drive CXL and standard on the CXS and all-wheel drive CXL.

All V6 models are equipped with the Hydra-Matic 6T70 6-speed automatic transmission.

Reception
The receptions by car critics was generally positive, recognizing the LaCrosse as competitive to the Lexus ES, Hyundai Azera, and Toyota Avalon.  By automotive journalists, comparisons to the Lexus ES 350 generally found both cars to be roughly comparable. According to The New York Times, the new LaCrosse combined design elements from classic American cars of the 1930s and 1950s with traditional Chinese aesthetic elements:

U.S. News & World Report aggregated the following ratings based on numerous reviews of the models years, also for the 2016 model year.  Results of the analysis were given on a scale of 1 to 10, where a higher number indicates positive reception. The overall result for the 2016 model year was 8.7, critics' rating 8.8, performance 8.1, interior 8.4, and safety 9.7.

Technology and features
The 2010 Buick LaCrosse CXS is the first North American car to incorporate a front suspension design, marketed as HiPer Strut, designed to improve ride and handling and reduces torque steer. The Buick LaCrosse CXS includes a system marketed as Real Time Damping that adjusts the damping forces of the shocks and struts for improved ride and handling.

The 2010, 2012, and 2013 models lacked an interior trunk release mechanism. The trunk was only accessible using the key fob (remote keyless entry) or a touch sensor between the trunk lid and the license plate. The 2011 year model added a remote release button at the left of the steering wheel on the instrument panel. The 2014 model refresh returned the trunk release button to LaCrosse but placed it on the driver door.

For 2016, the LaCrosse added a new Sport Touring Edition which included unique 18" aluminum black pocket wheels and a rear lip spoiler.

eAssist
The 2012 LaCrosse features a new mild hybrid as its base model. Dubbed eAssist, the 2012 LaCrosse introduced GM's second generation belted-alternator starter system. The non-hybrid 4-cylinder is no longer offered. The system consists of a 115-volt lithium-ion battery pack, a 15 kW electric motor capable of adding 15 horsepower of assist while accelerating, and the next generation 6T40 GM Hydramatic transmission with reduced friction components over the previous generation. The eAssist LaCrosse delivers a class leading fuel economy of 25 mpg city and 36 mpg highway. In addition to providing additional power to the 182 hp 2.4-liter 4-cylinder, the BAS-II system allows for engine start/stop operation when the vehicle isn't moving and allows for complete fuel cut off to the engine during deceleration.
The LaCrosse was sold in Mexico starting in 2010, as the Buick brand returned to the country after 13 years of absence.

For 2016, the LaCrosse added a new Sport Touring Edition which included unique 18" aluminum black pocket wheels and a rear lip spoiler.

Canadian market: Allure
The 2nd generation LaCrosse debuted to the Canadian market at the 2009 Montreal International Auto Show as the Buick Allure, and soon after production began, General Motors Canada renamed the Allure to LaCrosse, to correspond with the car's global marketing. GM Canada has offered existing Allure owners the option to change nameplates to LaCrosse.

Korean market: Alpheon
The Alpheon was a localized version of the Buick LaCrosse for the South Korean market. Alpheon was a standalone brand from GM Korea. The cars were additionally fitted with amenities such as controls in the rear armrest, mood lights and more.  A version of the vehicle (with 3.0-liter V-6 engine, six-speed automatic transmission) was unveiled at the 2010 Busan International Motor Show.

Production began on August 9, 2010 at GM Daewoo's factory in Bupyeong, Incheon. Market launch began in September 2010. Early model includes a model with 3.0-liter engine (from 2010 Buick LaCrosse) in mid-September, followed by two models each with 2.4-liter engine in October.

The Alpheon was discontinued in 2015, after monthly sales fell below 500 cars.  GM Korea replaced it with the Chevrolet Impala.

Chinese market: Roewe 950

The Roewe 950 is a  Chinese version of the Buick LaCrosse produced by Roewe of SAIC. It is sold alongside the Buick LaCrosse in China, and has a price range similar to that of the LaCrosse. The sheet metal, while similar in appearance, is unique to the Roewe.

In late February 2012, the Chinese government took the Buick LaCrosse (along with all other foreign vehicles) off of the list of vehicles approved for government procurement. Though popular among government officials the LaCrosse also thrives via private purchases. Effects on sales remains to be seen.

2014 facelift

Buick unveiled a revised 2014 LaCrosse at the 2013 New York Auto Show. Redesigned front and rear fascias, new wheel designs, a reconfigurable 8 inch TFT instrument cluster, semi-aniline leather seating, and radar- and camera-based safety features such as forward collision alert and side blind zone alert highlight the changes for this mid-cycle refresh.

Production
Production of North American models moved from Oshawa to the Fairfax Assembly plant in Kansas City, Kansas, where it runs down the same production line as the Chevrolet Malibu. Delivery of 2010 year models was delayed a few weeks in order to assure quality control. Production for China started a month later.

Third generation (2017)

The third generation LaCrosse debuted at the 2015 LA Auto Show as a 2017 model using E2XX platform shared with the 2016–present Chevrolet Impala. The weight reduction was achieved by use of high-strength steels and better sound-absorbing material. The car is powered by a GM Small Gasoline Engine and GM Ecotec engine in China for tax credit purposes and by a Fourth Generation GM High Feature engine in North America. Starting 2018, the LaCrosse comes standard with an eAssist drivetrain, consisting of a mild hybrid  electric and 2.5-liter Ecotec gasoline engine sending power to the front wheels through a 6-speed automatic transmission. In order to make room for an upcoming new product in the Kansas City, KS facility, the production of the LaCrosse was moved from GM Fairfax Assembly to Detroit/Hamtramck Assembly.

The main difference between the North American and Chinese models sold is the drive system. Models sold in the Chinese market are front wheel drive vehicles compared to their American counterparts which are available in front wheel drive or all wheel drive.

Third generation features include:
Automatic parking assist (front ultrasonic parking assist is now present).
Apple CarPlay and Android Auto for the Buick IntelliLink infotainment system.
An all-new 3.6-liter direct-injection VVT V6 engine (LGX 310 hp / 282 lb-ft), with stop-start and cylinder deactivation.
Externally sourced 8-speed Aisin (AWF8F35) automatic transmission (2017 only).
Starting 2018 an all-new 9-speed GM 9T60 (M3G) automatic transmission with the optional V6.

Safety

The 2017 LaCrosse received a Top Safety Pick in the Insurance Institute for Highway Safety's Crashworthiness test and a Poor rating for headlights, which prevented a Top Safety Pick Plus. The LaCrosse comes standard with 10 air bags including front air bags, roof rail-mounted head-curtain air bags, seat-mounted side-impact air bags for both front and rear outboard seat passengers, and knee air bags for front seat passengers. Additional standard safety features include Ultra-sonic rear parking assist, and backup camera. Optional safety features include a following distance indicator, forward collision alert, forward collision braking, front pedestrian detection, blind spot detection, lane keeping assist, and rear-cross traffic alert.

Reception
The receptions by car critics was generally positive, but not without flaws. Car and Driver stated, "Elegant exterior, much-improved interior materials, impressive ride and handling with up level suspension," while U.S. News & World Report listed the 2017 LaCrosse as a Finalist for Best Large Car for Families. Motor Trend stated, "The car drops about 300 pounds and rides on a new platform, which contributes to a better driving experience and a much quieter ride. Buick also separates the LaCrosse from most competitors by offering all-wheel drive on the highest trim level," and listed the Kia Cadenza, Nissan Maxima, Chrysler 300, and Lexus ES as competitors.

Reviewers were critical of the gear selector, however, with Consumer Reports stating, "Our biggest gripe about the controls is the new electronic gear selector. Drivers used to a traditional PRNDL configuration—in other words, those drivers who kept the lights on for Buick for many years—will be puzzled, if not angered." In addition, reviewers were critical of the sticker price on top trim, heavily optioned models with Bloomberg stating, "by the time you spend the $48,395 it costs to get the LaCrosse to this level, you're creeping into Audi/BMW/Mercedes territory."

Discontinuation

The Buick LaCrosse is one of six vehicles GM discontinued after the 2019 model year amid a global restructuring effort by the company. The discontinuation of the LaCrosse only affects the North American market and Buick will continue to build the LaCrosse in China, where the sedan is a best seller. Production of the Buick LaCrosse for North America ceased on February 15, 2019.

2019 facelift

A facelift was introduced for the 2019 model year in the Chinese market, with the facelifted LaCrosse featuring a new 2.0-liter turbo engine to the powertrain options. The new 2.0-liter turbo engine is one of GM’s eighth-generation Ecotec engines and delivers a maximum output of 237 hp and 350 N-m (258 lb-ft) of torque. The 2019 LaCrosse is available with a nine-speed Hydra-Matic automatic transmission with an average fuel consumption of 6.9 liters per 100 kilometers (34 miles per gallon).
 Trim levels for the New LaCrosse model are known as the 652T Elite, 652T Luxury and 652T Distinguished. From 2021 onwards, the 552T trim level was available where a 1.5 litre turbocharged engine was also introduced as standard.

Yearly sales

References

External links

 

LaCrosse
Front-wheel-drive vehicles
Sedans
2010s cars
Goods manufactured in Canada
Goods manufactured in the United States
Cars introduced in 2004
Cars of Canada
Partial zero-emissions vehicles
Flagship vehicles